Andreas Beck (born 5 February 1986) is a German former professional tennis player. He achieved a career-high singles ranking of world No. 33 in November 2009. As a qualifier, Beck reached the quarterfinals of the 2009 Monte Carlo Masters.

Professional career

2008
In June, Beck qualified for the 2008 Wimbledon Championships, beating No. 218 Paolo Lorenzi, No. 194 Brendan Evans, and No. 280 Jaroslav Pospíšil. In his first round match he played World No. 2 Rafael Nadal on Centre Court, losing in straight sets.

2009
In the Monte-Carlo Masters, Beck entered as a qualifier and reached the quarterfinals, defeating sixth seed Gilles Simon and Juan Mónaco along the way. He was defeated by Stanislas Wawrinka in straight sets, the Swiss having beaten countryman and World No. 2 Roger Federer in the previous round. As a result of his performance in this tournament, Beck's ranking climbed 29 places in the ATP rankings to No. 60, while he reached his career-high of World No. 33 later in the year.

Beck reached his first ATP final at the Allianz Suisse Open Gstaad. He was defeated by qualifier Thomaz Bellucci.

ATP career finals

Singles: 1 (1 runner-up)

Doubles: 2 (2 runner-ups)

ATP Challenger and ITF Futures finals

Singles: 30 (14–16)

Doubles: 15 (8–7)

Junior Grand Slam finals

Doubles: 1 (1 runner-up)

Performance timeline

Singles

2012 Australian Open counts as 1 win, 0 loss. (Round 2 Roger Federer walkover after Beck withdrew because of lower back injury does not count as a Beck loss, nor a Federer win.)

References

External links
Andreas Beck official website
 
 
 
 

1986 births
Living people
People from Weingarten, Württemberg
Sportspeople from Tübingen (region)
German male tennis players
Tennis people from Baden-Württemberg